Mélanie Thierry is a French actress.

Early life and career
Mélanie Thierry began her career as a model in France, then moved into acting. She began with a series of roles in French productions, and at the age of 17 appeared in the internationally distributed The Legend of 1900. She also appeared opposite Rufus Sewell in two episodes of the BBC costume drama Charles II: The Power and The Passion, playing the king's French mistress Louise de Kérouaille.

Thierry made her Hollywood début in the 2008 film Babylon A.D., as Aurora.

Mélanie Thierry will be the President of the 2021 Camera d'or that will award a first feature film selected at the Festival de Cannes.

Filmography

References

External links

 

1981 births
Living people
People from Saint-Germain-en-Laye
French film actresses
French television actresses
20th-century French actresses
21st-century French actresses
Most Promising Actress César Award winners